Carte Blanche is the second studio album by French record producer DJ Snake, released on 26 July 2019 through Geffen Records.

It includes the singles "Magenta Riddim", "Taki Taki" (featuring Selena Gomez, Ozuna and Cardi B), "Try Me" (with Plastic Toy), "SouthSide" (with Eptic), "Enzo" (with Sheck Wes featuring Offset, 21 Savage and Gucci Mane), "Loco Contigo" (with J Balvin featuring Tyga) and "Fuego" (with Sean Paul and Anitta featuring Tainy), as well as other collaborations with Zhu, Anitta, Gashi, Majid Jordan, Bryson Tiller, Zomboy, Tchami, Malaa, and Mercer.

Promotion
DJ Snake stated on social media on 15 July that he had a "big announcement" to make the following day. On 16 July, he revealed the release date and posted the cover art, a picture of the left corner of the Arc de Triomphe, on top of which he DJed in 2017.

Track listing
Adapted from Apple Music.

Deluxe edition
Adapted from Apple Music.

Charts

Weekly charts

Year-end charts

Certifications

References

2019 albums
DJ Snake albums